Offizierstellvertreter Otto Esswein (3 March 1890 – 21 July 1918) was a German World War I flying ace credited with twelve aerial victories.

Early life
Otto Esswein was born in Waiblingen, in the Kingdom of Württemberg within the German Empire, on 3 March 1890.

Aviation service

Details of Esswein's entry into military service are not available. However, Esswein transferred from ground service to aviation in mid-1915. On 30 October 1917, he was assigned to Jagdstaffel 26. He scored his first victory, shooting down a Sopwith Camel on 15 November. He was then slightly wounded in the right eye on 27 November.

When he returned to the squadron in early 1918, a new Fokker Dr.I triplane awaited him. He used it to shoot down another Camel on 2 February, three more the next day, and two more British fighters on the 5th, one of which was the Royal Aircraft Factory SE-5 of No. 84 Squadron RFC's Lt. Cyril Ball, brother of English ace Albert Ball. By 26 March 1918, he was a double ace with ten victories. On 31 May, he increased his tally to a dozen with his two last victories. He was awarded the Military Merit Cross on 3 June 1918 to join his Iron Crosses, and later awarded his home kingdom's Military Merit Order. On 16 July, in one of the pioneer usages of a parachute, he successfully bailed out of his burning plane after being shot down attacking a balloon. Five days later he was unable to repeat the feat and was killed in action in another flaming aircraft over Hartennes-et-Taux, France.

Sources of information

References

 Franks, Norman; Bailey, Frank W.; Guest, Russell (1993). Above the Lines: The Aces and Fighter Units of the German Air Service, Naval Air Service and Flanders Marine Corps, 1914–1918. Grub Street. , .

1890 births
1918 deaths
Aviators killed by being shot down
German military personnel killed in World War I
German World War I flying aces
Luftstreitkräfte personnel
Military personnel of Württemberg
People from the Kingdom of Württemberg
People from Waiblingen
Recipients of the Iron Cross (1914), 1st class
Military personnel from Baden-Württemberg